Balder is a wooden roller coaster at the Liseberg amusement park in Gothenburg, Sweden. It opened in 2003 and was an instant success.

Balder is very different from a traditional wooden roller coaster because it is a prefabricated wooden roller coaster. This means that instead of trackers cutting, shaping, and laying down the track on site by hand, the track is laser cut in a factory. This means that the track is manufactured to a higher degree of precision than could ever be achieved by hand. The track is also made so that it snaps together like Lego pieces. The track also is made of more layers of wood that are tightly bonded together instead of nailed together by hand like a traditional wooden roller coaster. This has three major benefits, two being to the park and the other being to the riders.

The "Plug and Play" aspect of the coaster speeds construction of the coaster since track does not have to be completely manufactured on site. In addition, because of the speed of construction, the costs of building the coaster are lowered due to less man-hours spent on the construction. The riders benefit from a coaster, that while being wooden, is near steel smooth. However, some roller coaster enthusiasts may find that aspect to take away from the ride since it would not have the same character as a traditional wooden roller coaster. Balder is praised by many roller coaster enthusiasts around the world, and is said to be one of the best roller coasters in Europe. Three other prefabricated wooden roller coasters currently exist, Colossos at Heide Park, El Toro at Six Flags Great Adventure, and T Express in Everland.

Awards

References

External links

Balder info on Liseberg home page

Liseberg
Roller coasters introduced in 2003
Roller coasters in Sweden
2003 establishments in Sweden